A Grand Slam in the sport of real tennis is earned by a player who holds the following titles in the same calendar year:
 Australian Open
 U.S. Open
 French Open
 British Open

The concept was borrowed from lawn tennis's Grand Slam. In 1984 Chris Ronaldson, then in 2000 and 2001 Robert Fahey earned back-to-back Grand Slams, and Fahey earned his third Grand Slam again in 2008.  For ladies, Charlotte Cornwallis made it twice.

Men's singles

Men's doubles

See also
 List of real tennis world champions

References 

Real tennis